Martin Koek (born 31 October 1952) is a Dutch former professional tennis player.

A right-handed player, Koek reached a career high singles ranking of 555 in the world.

Koek is most notable for his appearance in the men's doubles main draw at the 1973 Australian Open. His partner was Australian veteran Frank Sedgman, who he had spent the summer training with.

During his career he won two Dutch national championships, one for mixed doubles in 1979 and the other a men's doubles title in 1983.

References

External links
 
 

1952 births
Living people
Dutch male tennis players